Dawn Roma French (born 11 October 1957) is a British actress, comedian, presenter and writer. French is known for writing and starring on the BBC comedy sketch show French and Saunders with her best friend and comedy partner, Jennifer Saunders, and played the lead role as Geraldine Granger in the BBC sitcom The Vicar of Dibley. She has been nominated for seven BAFTA TV Awards and won a BAFTA Fellowship with Saunders in 2009.

Early life
Dawn Roma French was born on 11 October 1957 in Holyhead, Wales, to English parents Felicity Roma (née O'Brien; 1934 – 2012) and Denys Vernon French (5 August 1932 – 11 September 1977), who married in their home town of Plymouth in 1953. French has an older brother, Gary. Her father served in the Royal Air Force, stationed at RAF Valley and later RAF Leconfield, where Queen Elizabeth The Queen Mother went to tea at French's home when French was three years old. An RAF archive footage of this event was included in French's comedy tour/video Thirty Million Minutes.

The RAF partly funded French's private education. When her father was stationed at RAF Faldingworth, French attended Caistor Grammar School for one year. She later attended boarding school at St Dunstan's Abbey School for Girls in Plymouth (since absorbed by Plymouth College), where she was a member of Downton house. After graduating, she spent a year studying at the Spence School in New York, due to a debating scholarship she won whilst attending boarding school.

French has said that her self-confidence and self-belief stem from her father, who told her how beautiful she was each day. She stated, "He taught me to value myself. He told me that I was beautiful and the most precious thing in his life." Denys had a history of severe depression and made two suicide attempts, but managed to conceal his illness from Dawn and Gary. When French was nineteen years old, her father committed suicide by car exhaust.

In 1977, French began studying drama at Royal Central School of Speech and Drama, where she met her future comedy partner, Jennifer Saunders. Both came from RAF backgrounds. They had grown up on the same base, even having had the same best friend, although never meeting. Saunders recalled her first perception of French was that she was a "cocky little upstart"; French considered Saunders to be snooty and aloof. The comic duo originally did not like each other as French wanted to become a drama teacher whereas Saunders loathed the idea and thus disliked French for being enthusiastic and confident about the course.

French and Saunders shared a flat whilst at college and were influenced to do comedy by their flatmates as part of their projects for college. After talking in depth for the first time, they came to be friends. While at college, French broke up with her fiancé, a former Royal Navy officer. After French and Saunders graduated from the Royal Central School, they decided to form a double-act called the Menopause Sisters. Saunders has described the act, which involved wearing tampons in their ears, as "cringeworthy". The manager of the club recalled, "They didn't seem to give a damn. There was no star quality about them at all." French and Saunders came to public attention as members of the Comic Strip, part of the alternative comedy scene in the early 1980s.

Career

Television

1980s
French has had an extensive career on television, debuting on Channel 4's The Comic Strip Presents series in an episode called "Five Go Mad in Dorset" in 1982. Each episode presented a self-contained story and, in addition to French and Saunders, showcased Comic Strip performers Peter Richardson, Rik Mayall, Nigel Planer, Robbie Coltrane and Adrian Edmondson. She acted in 27 of the 37 episodes and wrote two of them. One episode featured a parody of spaghetti westerns and another a black and white film about a hopelessly goofy boy. Some of French's first exposure to a wider audience occurred when comedy producer Martin Lewis recorded a Comic Strip record album in 1981 which featured sketches by French & Saunders. The album was released on Springtime!/Island Records in September 1981 and presented French and Jennifer Saunders to an audience outside London. In 1985, French starred with Saunders, Tracey Ullman and Ruby Wax in Girls on Top, which portrayed four eccentric women sharing a flat in London.

French has co-written and starred in her and Saunders' comedy series, French & Saunders, which debuted in 1987. On their show, the duo have spoofed many celebrities such as Madonna, Cher, Catherine Zeta-Jones and the Spice Girls. They have also parodied films such as The Lord of the Rings, Star Wars and Harry Potter and the Chamber of Secrets. After 20 years being on television together, their sketch series A Bucket o' French & Saunders, began airing on 8 September 2007.

1990s
French and Saunders have also followed separate careers. During French's time starring in Murder Most Horrid, from 1991 to 1999, she played a different character each week, whether it was the murderer, victim, or both.

French's biggest solo television role to date has been as the title figure in the long-running BBC comedy The Vicar of Dibley, which Richard Curtis created for her. The show began in 1994. She stars as Geraldine Granger, a vicar of a small fictional village called Dibley. An audience of 12.3 million watched the final full-length episode to see her character's marriage ceremony. She appeared on The Vicar of Dibley with Damian Lewis in a mini-episode made for Comic Relief in 2013. She was nominated for a BAFTA for Best Comedy Performance in the last episode of The Vicar of Dibley. Repeats of the show on BBC One still attract millions of viewers and it also retains a following amongst PBS viewers in the United States. Although the main series ended in 2007, the show has returned for numerous short special episodes since, the latest four of which aired in December 2020.

In 1995 she appeared as a talk-show host in a Comic Relief sketch called Dawn, written by Victoria Wood. The sketch also featured Wood herself, Celia Imrie, Lill Roughley, Anne Reid, Philip Lowrie, Robert Kingswell, Bryan Burdon, Duncan Preston, Jim Broadbent, and Lynda Bellingham.

2000s
In 2002, French appeared in the comedy/drama mini-series Ted and Alice. In the series, set in the Lake District, French played a tourist information officer who falls in love with an alien. She appeared once in the Saunders led sitcom Absolutely Fabulous as TV interviewer Kathy in 1992, a parody of Lorraine Kelly, she reprised that role for Absolutely Fabulous: The Movie in 2016 as a more established veteran journalist as Kelly is now. She also appeared in the BBC sitcom Wild West, with Catherine Tate, in which she played a woman living in Cornwall who is a lesbian, more through lack of choice than any specific natural urge. This series did not meet with as much success as her earlier roles and it ended in 2004 after two years.

French played a major role in Jam & Jerusalem as a woman called Rosie who has dissociative identity disorder and with it an alter ego called "Margaret". She co-starred alongside Sue Johnston, Jennifer Saunders (who also created and wrote the series) and Joanna Lumley. She made a guest appearance in Little Britain as Vicky Pollard's mother. French also appeared in a special version of Little Britain Live which featured several celebrity guests and was shown by the BBC as part of Comic Relief. She played the part of a lesbian barmaid in a sketch with Daffyd Thomas.

In 2006, French appeared in Agatha Christie's Marple in the 2006 episode "Sleeping Murder". She appeared as Caroline Arless in the BBC television drama Lark Rise to Candleford in 2008. Talking about her role, she has stated, "I'm quite a vibrant character. She's quite extreme, in that she drinks too much, laughs too much and sings too much. But she loves her family very much; it's just that she goes over the top sometimes."

2010s
In late 2010, French starred in Roger & Val Have Just Got In with actor Alfred Molina, which aired for two series.

French appeared in Little Crackers, short comedy films which were broadcast over Christmas in 2010.

French appeared as a special guest on Michael Bublé's Home For Christmas in December 2011. In July 2012, she was a judge in ITV's Superstar live shows. In March 2013, it was announced that French would replace Brian McFadden on the judging panel of Nine Network's Australia's Got Talent alongside Kyle Sandilands, Geri Halliwell (who replaced Dannii Minogue) and Timomatic who is the additional fourth judge. French departed the show after one series and was replaced by Kelly Osbourne.

From 2016 until 2019 French starred in three series of Delicious on Sky 1, co-starring as a talented cook who is having an affair with her celebrity chef ex-husband (Iain Glen) who has remarried and started a successful hotel business with his new wife (Emilia Fox) in Cornwall.

2020s
In 2020 she appeared in the six-part series The Trouble with Maggie Cole alongside Mark Heap.

In 2021, French appeared as a celebrity guest judge on the second series of RuPaul's Drag Race UK, where she judged the final five contestants, Lawrence Chaney, Bimini Bon-Boulash, Tayce, Ellie Diamond and A'Whora, on their comedy stand-up routines.

Film
In 1996 French appeared in The Adventures of Pinocchio as "The Baker's Wife" alongside Martin Landau and star Jonathan Taylor Thomas. French played The Fat Lady in the film adaptation of Harry Potter and the Prisoner of Azkaban, replacing Elizabeth Spriggs, who played the character in the first film of the series. French's then-husband, Lenny Henry, provided the voice of the Shrunken Head in the same film, though they shared no screen time. In 2005 French provided the voice for the character Mrs. Beaver in Disney and Walden Media's film adaptation of C.S. Lewis' The Chronicles of Narnia: The Lion, the Witch and the Wardrobe. In 2010, French lent her voice to the role of Angie the Elephant in the English dub of the German-British environmental animated film Animals United.

Theatre
She has also taken roles in the theatre. French has appeared in plays such as A Midsummer Night's Dream, My Brilliant Divorce, and Smaller, the latter of which she played a schoolteacher caring for her disabled mother. January 2007 saw French performing as the Duchesse de Crackentorp at the Royal Opera House, Covent Garden, London, in The Daughter of the Regiment (La fille du régiment) by Gaetano Donizetti starring Natalie Dessay and Juan Diego Flórez. French returned to Covent Garden and La Fille du règiment in the 2010 revival.

In December 2022, French began appearing in Jack and the Beanstalk at the London Palladium.

Stand-up comedy
In 2014, French toured an autobiographical one woman show 30 Million Minutes in the UK and Oceania. The title is based on the amount of minutes she had been alive at the time of producing the show.

In 2022, she toured the UK with a further show titled Dawn French is a Huge Tw*t. In late 2022 it was announced that she would continue touring the UK with the same show in autumn 2023.

Advertising
French was chosen as the face of Terry's Chocolate Orange, until August 2007, when she was dropped. She has also been in advertisements for the Churchill Insurance Company.

In 2019, French provided her voice for numerous Station idents for Greatest Hits Radio. This was produced in partnership with Bespoke Music.

In 2021, French was chosen to play the voice of a fairy lady for the Christmas food advertisements for leading retailer Marks and Spencers alongside Tom Holland voicing the company's mascot Percy Pig (who came to life for the first time in 29 years). In the main advert French as the fairy drops her magic wand onto a box covered in Percy pig wrappings, the lid opens and Percy pops out of the box. Throughout the rest of the advertisement she shows Percy all of the items which the retailer was selling for Christmas food.

She later reprised the role for the 2022 M&S Christmas advert, playing alongside Jennifer Saunders voicing a sidekick called ‘Duckie’. The pair, in the main advert, go on a journey to fill Duckie with ‘some festive cheer’ while showing off the M&S Food Christmas range for 2022.

Writing
French has also written a best-selling epistolary autobiography, which she has titled Dear Fatty. French was paid a £1.5 million advance for the book, which was released in 2008. On an appearance on The Paul O'Grady Show on 6 October 2008, French said that "Fatty" is her nickname for Jennifer Saunders, as a joke about her own size. French said that she became great friends with Saunders well before they started working together, which was "over 30 years ago". The book consists of letters to the different people who have been in her life. In 2017, Me. You. A Diary, French's second non-fiction book, was released. She has also written four novels – A Tiny Bit Marvellous (2010), Oh Dear Silvia (2012), According to Yes (2015) and Because of You (2020).

Music videos
In 1986 she appeared in Kate Bush's music video "Experiment IV" alongside Hugh Laurie, Richard Vernon and Peter Vaughan.

French has appeared in the videos for Alison Moyet's songs "Love Letters" (which also featured Saunders) in 1987 and "Whispering Your Name" in 1994.

She also appeared in two Comic Relief music videos. In 1989 she joined Jennifer Saunders and Kathy Burke to form Lananeeneenoonoo and, along with Bananarama, they created a charity single to raise money for Comic Relief. It was a cover version of The Beatles song "Help!", and was released on the London Records label, entering the UK Singles Chart on 25 February 1989 and reaching a high of #3. It remained in the chart for nine weeks.

French, Saunders and Burke returned for Comic Relief in 1997 as "The Sugar Lumps," along with Llewella Gideon and Lulu, to parody The Spice Girls, with whom they performed a version of "Who Do You Think You Are?".

Personal life
French met comedian Lenny Henry on the alternative comedy circuit. The couple married on 20 October 1984 in Covent Garden, London. They adopted a daughter, Billie. French has stated that Billie has always known that she was adopted, but once took out an injunction when a biographer came close to revealing the identity of Billie's biological mother. When faced with a question about how she and Henry would feel if Billie wanted to find out about her birth mother, French commented, "Whatever she wants to do when she's 18, we'll support her. What I do worry about is anyone else making the decision for her."

During the 2010 UK general election campaign, French was cited as a supporter of the Labour Party. She supported Keir Starmer during the 2020 Labour Party leadership election.

On 6 April 2010, French and Henry announced they were separating after 25 years of marriage. It was reported that the separation was amicable. They had decided to separate in October the previous year but left announcing it until some months later, as they were still in discussion over the separation. Their divorce was finalised later that year.

French began dating charity executive Mark Bignell in 2011. On 22 April 2013, it was reported that they had just married. The couple resided in Fowey, Cornwall, in a mansion overlooking Readymoney Cove. The Grade II-listed building dates back to the 19th century.
In May 2021 it was announced that French had sold her Fowey property, having moved to an 1868 Gothic revival property in Calstock.

In September 2014, French was named as the new Chancellor of Falmouth University.

French is a supporter of Plymouth Argyle.

Awards and recognition
French and Saunders won the honorary Golden Rose of Montreux award in 2002 and in 2003, she was listed in The Observer as one of the 50 funniest acts in British comedy. In a 2006 poll consisting of 4,000 people, French was named as the most admired female celebrity amongst women in Britain.

In February 2013 she was assessed as one of the 100 most powerful women in the United Kingdom by Woman's Hour on BBC Radio 4.

BAFTA Awards
1989 – Nominated – BAFTA TV Award for Best Light Entertainment Performance in French and Saunders
1991 – Nominated – BAFTA TV Award for Best Light Entertainment Performance in French and Saunders
1998 – Nominated – BAFTA TV Award for Best Comedy Performance in The Vicar of Dibley
2000 – Nominated – BAFTA TV Award for Best Comedy Performance in The Vicar of Dibley
2001 – Nominated – BAFTA TV Award for Best Comedy Performance in The Vicar of Dibley
2007 – Nominated – BAFTA TV Award for Best Comedy Performance in The Vicar of Dibley
2009 – Won – BAFTA Fellowship – awarded with Jennifer Saunders
2011 – Nominated – BAFTA TV Award for Best Female Comedy Performance in Roger and Val Have Just Got In

British Comedy Awards
1997 – Won – British Comedy Award for Best TV Comedy Actress in The Vicar of Dibley
1998 – Nominated – British Comedy Award for Best TV Comedy Actress in The Vicar of Dibley
2011 – Nominated – British Comedy Awards for Best TV Comedy Actress in Psychoville

National Television Awards
1998 – Nominated – National Television Award for Most Popular Comedy Performer in The Vicar of Dibley
2000 – Nominated – National Television Award for Most Popular Comedy Performer in The Vicar of Dibley
2002 – Nominated – National Television Award for Most Popular Comedy Performance in Ted and Alice
2003 – Nominated – National Television Award for Most Popular Comedy Performance in Wild West

Other
1991 – Won – Writers' Guild of Great Britain Award for TV- Light Entertainment in French and Saunders
2001 – Along with Jennifer Saunders, declined an OBE
2002 – Won – Rose d'Or Light Entertainment Festival Award shared with Jennifer Saunders
2009 – Nominated – Annie Award for Voice Acting in a Feature Production for Coraline

Acting credits

Television

Film

Theatre

Video games

Bibliography
 Fiction
A Tiny Bit Marvellous (Penguin, 2010)
Oh Dear Silvia (Penguin, 2012)
According to Yes (Penguin, 2015)
Because of You (Michael Joseph, 2020)

Autobiography
Dear Fatty (Arrow, 2007)
Me. You. A Diary (Penguin, 2017)

 Comedy
Girls on Top (with Jennifer Saunders and Ruby Wax) (HarperCollins, 1986)
A Feast of French and Saunders (with Jennifer Saunders) (Mandarin, 1992)

 Other
Big Knits: Bold, Beautiful, Designer Knitwear (with Sylvie Soudan) (Ebury, 1990)
Great Big Knits: Over Twenty Designer Patterns (with Sylvie Soudan) (Trafalgar Square, 1993)
Frigid Women by Sue and Victoria Riches (with a foreword by Dawn French) (Eye Books Direct, 1996)
Cruising by Beryl Cook (with a foreword by Dawn French) (Victor Gollancz, 2000)

References

External links

Dawn French at the British Film Institute
Dawn French (Aveleyman)
Biography at the Museum of Broadcast Communications
French and Saunders

1957 births
Living people
20th-century British actresses
20th-century British comedians
21st-century British actresses
21st-century British comedians
21st-century British novelists
21st-century British women writers
Alumni of the Royal Central School of Speech and Drama
Australia's Got Talent
BAFTA fellows
British comedy actresses
British film actresses
British memoirists
British people of Irish descent
British stage actresses
British television actresses
British voice actresses
British women comedians
British women non-fiction writers
British women novelists
Labour Party (UK) people
People associated with Falmouth University
People educated at Caistor Grammar School
People from Holyhead
People from Shinfield
Spence School alumni
The Comic Strip
British women memoirists
21st-century memoirists
Actors from Anglesey